The 1996–97 DFB-Pokal was the 54th season of the annual German football cup competition. Sixty-four teams competed in the tournament of six rounds which began on 9 August 1996 and ended on 16 June 1997. In the final, VfB Stuttgart defeated third tier Energie Cottbus 2–0, thereby claiming their third title.

Matches

First round

Second round

Round of 16

Quarter-finals

Semi-finals

Final

References

External links
 Official site of the DFB 
 Kicker.de 

1996-97
1996–97 in German football cups